Puxico is a city in Stoddard County, Missouri, United States. The population was 881 at the 2010 census.

History
Puxico was first settled in 1883, and named after Pucksicah, an Indian chief. Early settlers include W. C. Clark, E.L Hawks, George Eaton and J.A Hickman. A post office called Puxico has been in operation since 1884. Puxico was incorporated as a town in 1884.

Puxico Homecoming
Puxico is known for its annual Homecoming, held from the second Tuesday to Saturday in August and sponsored by the local Veterans of Foreign Wars Post. It includes events such as a carnival fair, square dancing, beauty pageants and parade.

Geography
Puxico is located at  (36.950535, -90.158611).

Demographics

2010 census
As of the census of 2010, there were 881 people, 364 households, and 227 families living in the city. The racial makeup of the city was 97.0% White, 0.1% African American, 1.1% Native American, 0.1% Asian, 0.1% Pacific Islander, and 1.5% from two or more races. Hispanic or Latino of any race were 1.5% of the population.

There were 364 households, of which 31.0% had children under the age of 18 living with them, 43.4% were married couples living together, 17.3% had a female householder with no husband present, 1.6% had a male householder with no wife present, and 37.6% were non-families. 34.9% of all households were made up of individuals, and 17.6% had someone living alone who was 65 years of age or older. The average household size was 2.33 and the average family size was 3.01.

The median age in the city was 40.6 years. 24% of residents were under the age of 18; 8.4% were between the ages of 18 and 24; 21.8% were from 25 to 44; 22.9% were from 45 to 64; and 22.9% were 65 years of age or older. The gender makeup of the city was 46.2% male and 53.8% female.

2000 census
As of the census of 2000, there were 1,145 people, 377 households, and 232 families living in the city. The population density was 2,089.4 people per square mile (803.8/km). There were 444 housing units at an average density of 810.2 per square mile (311.7/km). The racial makeup of the city was 98.41% White, 0.19% African American, 0.17% Native American, 0.61% from other races, and 0.61% from two or more races. Hispanic or Latino of any race were 0.79% of the population.

There were 377 households, out of which 27.1% had children under the age of 18 living with them, 46.9% were married couples living together, 11.7% had a female householder with no husband present, and 38.2% were non-families. 35.5% of all households were made up of individuals, and 22.0% had someone living alone who was 65 years of age or older. The average household size was 2.20 and the average family size was 2.85.

In the city the population was spread out, with 28.0% under the age of 18, 16.6% from 18 to 24, 18.6% from 25 to 44, 14.1% from 45 to 64, and 22.6% who were 65 years of age or older. The median age was 31 years. For every 100 females, there were 107.4 males. For every 100 females age 18 and over, there were 90.3 males.

The median income for a household in the city was $20,900, and the median income for a family was $29,286. Males had a median income of $25,787 versus $18,929 for females. The per capita income for the city was $11,354. About 13.3% of families and 33.8% of the population were below the poverty line, including 33.3% of those under age 18 and 22.2% of those age 65 or over.

Education
Public education in Puxico is administered by Puxico R-VIII School District.

Puxico has a lending library, the Puxico Public Library.

Climate
The climate in this area is characterized by relatively high temperatures and evenly distributed precipitation throughout the year.  According to the Köppen Climate Classification system, Puxico has a humid subtropical climate, abbreviated "Cfa" on climate maps.

References

External links
 Puxico R-8 School District
 Puxico Area Free Non Profit Site"Free for the people by the people , Photos , Videos , Chatboxes , Maps , Forums , & So Much more Also This Was Posted By PuxicoOnline Founder"

Cities in Stoddard County, Missouri
1883 establishments in Missouri
Populated places established in 1883
Cities in Missouri